Partula mooreana, common name the Moorean viviparous tree snail, is a species of air-breathing tropical land snail, a terrestrial pulmonate gastropod mollusk in the family Partulidae. This species was endemic to French Polynesia. It is now extinct in the wild.

Original description 
Partula mooreana was originally described by William Dell Hartman (1817–1899) in 1880. Hartman's original text (the type description) reads as follows:

References
This article incorporates public domain text from reference.

External links

Partula (gastropod)
Taxonomy articles created by Polbot
Gastropods described in 1880